Munt Buffalora (2,630 m) is a mountain of the Ortler Alps, located south of the Ofen Pass in the Swiss canton of Graubünden.

Climate

References

External links
 Munt Buffalora on Hikr

Mountains of the Alps
Mountains of Graubünden
Ortler Alps
Mountains of Switzerland
Two-thousanders of Switzerland